Eleutherodactylus wetmorei is a species of frog in the family Eleutherodactylidae.

Distribution and habitat
It is endemic to Hispaniola and occurs in both the Dominican Republic and Haiti. Specifically, it occurs on the Tiburon Peninsula (Haiti) and east to the Massif de la Selle in the southwestern Dominican Republic, and on the Massif du Nord in north-central Haiti east to west-central Dominican Republic. Its natural habitat is mesic broadleaf forest.

Behaviour
It is an arboreal species occurring bromeliads and other plants, and also in leaf axils of bananas plantations. Eggs are laid in bromeliads.

Conservation
It is threatened by habitat loss caused by logging and agriculture. It is known from several protected areas, but most of them are in need of better management.

References

wetmorei
Endemic fauna of Hispaniola
Amphibians of the Dominican Republic
Amphibians of Haiti
Taxa named by Doris Mable Cochran
Amphibians described in 1932
Taxonomy articles created by Polbot